Reynolds View is a suburb of Johannesburg, South Africa. It is located in Region F of the City of Johannesburg Metropolitan Municipality.

History
Named after Alice Ethel Reynolds who in 1924 asked for the Western Reserves Malvern to be proclaim as a suburb and was done so in 1930.

References

Johannesburg Region F